

Winners and nominees

1990s

2000s

2010s

Records 
 Most awarded actor: César Évora and Ernesto Laguardia, 2 times.
 Most nominated actor: César Évora with 3 nominations.
 Most nominated actor without a win: Alejandro Tommasi, Héctor Bonilla and Fabián Robles with 2 nominations.
 Actor winning all nominations: Ernesto Laguardia, 2 times.
 Youngest winner: Pablo Montero, 27 years old.
 Youngest nominee: Fabián Robles, 27 years old.
 Oldest winner: Eric del Castillo, 71 years old.
 Oldest nominee: Eric del Castillo, 80 years old.
 Actor winning after short time: César Évora by (El Privilegio de Amar, 1999) and (Laberintos de pasión, 2000), 2 consecutive years.
 Actor winning after long time: Ernesto Laguardia by (Amor Real, 2004) and (Alborada, 2006), 2 years difference.
 Actor that winning the award for the same role: Ernesto Laguardia (Amor Real, 2004) and Osvaldo Benavides (Lo que la vida me robó, 2015)
 Actor winning this category, despite having been as a main villain:
 Ernesto Laguardia (Amor Real, 2004)
 Flavio Medina (Amor bravío, 2013)
 Manuel "Flaco" Ibáñez (La mujer del Vendaval, 2014)
Foreign winning actor:
 César Évora from Cuba
 Juan Vidal from Dominican Republic
 Sergio Mur from Spain

References

External links 
TVyNovelas at esmas.com
TVyNovelas Awards at the univision.com

Supporting Actor
Supporting
Supporting
Awards established in 1993
Awards disestablished in 2018